Virginio "Viri" Rosetta (25 February 1902 – 31 March 1975) was an Italian footballer who played as a defender. A hard-working player, he was known for his organisational skills, and for his ability to read the game and anticipate other players; he was also known to be a very precise passer of the ball, and an elegant full-back with good technique and a powerful shot, who was capable of starting plays from the back-line.

Club career
Rosetta was born in Vercelli, Piedmont, where he debuted for Pro Vercelli in the Italian First Division (Serie A's predecessor) in the 1919–20 season, as a striker. He later turned into an effective defender.

Pro Vercelli was then one of the major Italian football teams, and Rosetta won two scudetti in 1921 and 1922. He debuted for Italy at the 1920 Summer Olympics, forming a partnership with Renzo De Vecchi.

In 1923 he moved to Juventus, where he was paid as a footballer for the first time. He won his first title in 1926, and was an integral part of the team which won five consecutive scudetti during the 1930s, serving as the club's captain.

He won a total of eight national championships, with the final five being Serie A titles, which is an Italian record. Only three other players, Gianluigi Buffon, Giovanni Ferrari, and Giuseppe Furino, have also won eight titles in the Italian leagues.

International career
Rosetta was a key member of the Italy national football team throughout his career, since joining the team in 1920; he received a total of 52 caps for Italy. He was a member of the team that took part at the 1920 Summer Olympics, and was also part of the squads which placed fifth at the 1924 Summer Olympics, and which subsequently won the bronze medal at the 1928 Summer Olympics. As well as the very successful squads of the 1927–30 Central European International Cup, 1931-32 Central European International Cup & 1933–35 Central European International Cup and last but not least, Rosetta was also a member of the 1934 FIFA World Cup winning squad. He was captain in Italy's first game at the tournament, but it proved to be his last international appearance and he did not play in the final itself.

After retirement
Rosetta retired from professional football in 1936. He died in Turin in 1975.

Honours

Player

Club
Pro Vercelli
Serie A: 1920–21, 1921–22

Juventus
Serie A: 1925–26, 1930–31, 1931–32, 1932–33, 1933–34, 1934–35

International
Italy
 FIFA World Cup: 1934
 Central European International Cup: 1927-30, 1933-35
 Central European International Cup: Runner-up: 1931–32
 Summer Olympics: Bronze 1928

Coach
Juventus
Coppa Italia: 1937–38

Palermo
Serie B: 1947–48

References

1902 births
1975 deaths
Italian footballers
Italy international footballers
Association football defenders
Serie A players
Juventus F.C. players
F.C. Pro Vercelli 1892 players
1934 FIFA World Cup players
FIFA World Cup-winning players
Olympic footballers of Italy
Olympic bronze medalists for Italy
Footballers at the 1920 Summer Olympics
Footballers at the 1924 Summer Olympics
Footballers at the 1928 Summer Olympics
Italian football managers
Juventus F.C. managers
S.S.D. Lucchese 1905 managers
Palermo F.C. managers
People from Vercelli
Olympic medalists in football
Medalists at the 1928 Summer Olympics
Footballers from Piedmont
Sportspeople from the Province of Vercelli